Carlos Delarios is an American sound engineer. He has been nominated for four Academy Awards in the category Best Sound. He worked on 130 films from 1980 to 2008.

Selected filmography
 WarGames (1983)
 2010: The Year We Make Contact (1984)
 RoboCop (1987)
 Total Recall (1990)

References

External links

Year of birth missing (living people)
Living people
American audio engineers